Byron Cummings (September 20, 1860 – May 21, 1954) is known as the dean of Southwestern archaeology. Cummings served as the University of Arizona’s 9th president (1927–28), Arizona State Museum’s first director (1915–38), founding head of UofA's  Department of Archaeology (1915–37), and the founder of the Arizona Archaeological and Historical Society (est. 1916).

Cummings was by all accounts a remarkable man. Remembered as the Dean of Southwestern Archaeology, he was an energetic teacher and brilliant scholar. He was also an American football coach and professor at the University of Utah. He served as the head football coach at the University of Utah 1897 where he was also a professor from 1893 to 1915. He later served as a professor at the University of Arizona. Exploration he and his students conducted in SE Utah and NE Arizona, then almost unknown to Americans, resulted in the discoveries of the Natural Bridges that President Roosevalt declared as Natural Bridges National Monument in 1908. Cummings continued hie explorations into Arizona, where he discovered Betatakin, Inscription House, and other famed cliff dwellings south  and east of Navaho Mountain.  On August 14,  1909, he  led his party to the discovery of Rainbow Natural Bridge. From the University of Arizona  continued his  archeological researches  each summer until he retired from the classroom and  the  Arizona State Museum in 1938, with the title of Director Emeritus. His  last field work  was at Kinishba,  a great ruin on the Apache reservation,  excavation of which  he pursued annually from 1931 through 1939 with student assistants majoring in anthropology. He restored part of the ruin and built a  local museum with the help of Apache labor, and he cared for it until 1946 when he retired asecond time in order to devote full time to his writings. Even at 70 few student helpers  could wield a  shovel as long and as efficiently as he, and none could equal him on a  cross-country  hike.

Southwestern archaeology
Professor Cummings did pioneering archaeological fieldwork in the early 1900s in southern Utah's San Juan country. Archaeologist Neil Judd, then Cummings' student, assisted in this work, as did other of Cummings' field students.

Cummings was the first to discover Pleistocene man in southern Arizona and his discoveries led to the eventual recognition of the Cochise culture that has been dated to before 6,000 B.C. He authored numerous articles, pamphlets and books about Southwestern cultures based on the sites and ruins he explored. One of his dreams was realized when in 1936 the doors of a new Arizona State Museum building were opened to the public.
He retired from the department of archaeology in 1937 and from the museum in 1938, but remained Director Emeritus until his death in Tucson in 1954 at the age of 93.

Discovery of Rainbow Bridge, 1909 
Prof. Cummings was co-head of the US party attempting to be the first Americans to visit this landmark, along with William B. Douglass, Examiner of Surveys for  the General Land Office. John Wetherill organized the Cummings expedition. There had been apparent friction between Cummings and Douglass over who would be the first to visit Rainbow Bridge. On August 14, 1909, the party reached the Bridge. Cummings and Douglass both spurred their horses in an attempt to be the first Americans to ride under the bridge. John Wetherill saw what was happening and, being closer to the bridge, went on ahead and rode first under the span.

Head coaching record

References

External links
 "Kinishba Lost and Found: Mid-Century Excavations and Contemporary Perspectives.", 2012 exhibit of ceramics collected by Dean Cummings at Kinishba & elsewhere, 1930s-40s
 

1860 births
1954 deaths
American archaeologists
University of Arizona faculty
University of Utah faculty
Utah Utes football coaches
Presidents of the University of Arizona
Rutgers University alumni
State University of New York at Oswego alumni
People from Franklin County, New York